Željko Dimitrijević (born 4 January 1971) is a gold medal-winning Paralympian athlete from Serbia. He competes in seated throws in the F51 classification, a class for quadriplegics. He is the current world record holder in club throw.

At the 2012 Summer Paralympics held in London, he won a gold medal in club throw, broke a world record and became first Paralympic gold medalist for Serbia. At the 2016 Summer Paralympics, Dimitrijević won another gold medal in the same event with new world record (29.96 m).

At the 2021 World Para Athletics European Championships, Dimitrijević won gold medal in club throw in the F51 classification with a new world record of 34.71 m.

References

External links

The Official Website of the London 2012 Paralympic Games - Željko Dimitrijević Profile 

Paralympic athletes of Serbia
Living people
1971 births
People from Petrovac, Serbia
World record holders in Paralympic athletics
People with tetraplegia
Track and field athletes with disabilities
Serbian people with disabilities
Sportsmen with disabilities
Male club throwers
Serbian male athletes
Athletes (track and field) at the 2012 Summer Paralympics
Athletes (track and field) at the 2016 Summer Paralympics
Athletes (track and field) at the 2020 Summer Paralympics
Medalists at the 2012 Summer Paralympics
Medalists at the 2016 Summer Paralympics
Medalists at the 2020 Summer Paralympics
World Para Athletics Championships winners
Paralympic gold medalists for Serbia
Paralympic silver medalists for Serbia
Paralympic medalists in athletics (track and field)